Funeral Composition is painting by Yiannis Moralis from 1958.

Description 
The painting has dimensions of 204 x 224 centimeters. It is in the collection of the National Gallery-Museum Alexandros Soutzos (Ex. 2432).

Analysis 
This work of Yannis Moralis brings together a number of key features that seem of interest and concern to the artist since the early 1950s. It manifests the experimentation taking place in the broader displacement of Greek painting in the 1950s and 1960 to formalities.

The subject of the composition is a farewell scene with clear references to thematic and component level to the ancient columns as he acknowledges: "The first to have correlated these works with ancient monuments and the tombstone was Manolis Hatzidakis, Angelos Prokopios, Elias Petropoulos, George Savvides. They followed other analyzes, more scientific. Seferis says, [...] the interpretation of each project is the interpretation of ourselves. But, it is true that there is in these works a sense of death that was taught by ancient monuments." The same had decisively affect the Pompeian painting ..

Even Xenagontas' students of the Athens School of Fine Arts, in the course of their visit to the National Gallery rooms in 1988, will stop in front of the particular project and referring to it will say: "Here the common denominator is the background color, preparation (ocher, black). the use as color, like a shadow, like the Byzantine and post the protroplasm. We work piecemeal, but must not lose the image of the whole. and do not hesitate to sacrifice. You start to paint when you start sacrifice, as he and Delacroix. Emotionally you can start from a detail. but another motivation and another how will the symbol. The painting is a language finite, like all languages. There can be everything we want to say. When you accept this the contract in a strange way, liberate. And you learn to read your works, after making them. This will help you a lot."

The Venice Biennale (1958) and the first solo exhibition in Athens (1959) 
The painting composition Funeral Composition is also of interest in connection with the participation of the artist in two reports important for his resume: his participation, along with Yannis Tsarouhis and Anthony Soho in 1958 at the Venice Biennale, where of course, Commissioner of Tonis Spiteris, representing Greece, and organize the first solo exhibition the artist held in Athens, showroom Armos particular, the next years. The painting was between projects Moralis presented in both cases.

In an international environment where most dominating remove, anthropocentric painting of Moralis and Tsarouhis initiate the interest of Gio Ponti, who will devote their magazine Domus "three pages, with plenty of pictures and text very laudatory", which of course will delight both dialectical artists, considering how hard it was for a Greek painter distract abroad. indeed will be the occasion to discuss all those features of representational painting involving removal, even if this sounds as paradox.

Giò Ponti:

References

Bibliography 
 Καψάλης, Δ. (επιμ.), Γιάννης Μόραλης. Σχέδια 1934-1994, Αθήνα, ΜΙΕΤ, 2008
 Κουτσομάλλης, Κ. (επιμ.), Παϊσιος, Ν. (τεκμηρίωση), Ι. Μόραλης. Μια ανίχνευση, Μουσείο Σύγχρονης Τέχνης, Άνδρος, 2008
 Μάλαμα, Ά. (επιμ.), Τιμή στον Γιάννη Μόραλη, Αθήνα, ΕΠΜΑΣ, 2011
 Μεντζαφού, Ό.,  «Γιάννης Μόραλης», Λεξικό Ελλήνων Καλλιτεχνών. Ζωγράφοι – Γλύπτες – Χαράκτες, 16ος-20ος αιώνας, Ε.Δ. Ματθιόπουλος (επιμ.), Αθήνα, Μέλισσα, 1999, σ. 146-152
 Μπόλης, Γ., Γιάννης Μόραλης, Αθήνα, Κ. Αδάμ Εκδοτική, 2005
 Οράτη, Ειρ. (εισαγωγή), Γιάννης Μόραλης. Χαρακτικά, Αθήνα, εκδόσεις Βέργος, 1993
 Τσιγκάκου, Φ.-Μ. (σύνταξη-επιμ.), Ι. Μόραλης. Άγγελοι, μουσική, ποίηση, Μουσείο Μπενάκη, Αθήνα, 2001
 Φωτόπουλος, Β. (επιμ.), Γιάννης Μόραλης, εισαγωγή: Παπαστάμος, Δ., Αθήνα, Όμιλος Εταιριών Εμπορικής Τράπεζας, 1988
 Χρήστου, Χρ, Μόραλης, καλλιτεχνική επιμ. έκδοσης: Β. Φωτόπουλος, Αθήνα, εκδόσεις Αδάμ, 1993

External links 
 Μόραλης, άγγελοι, μουσική, ποίηση  (Αρχείο ντοκιμαντέρ της ΕΡΤ)
 Γιάννης Μόραλης (μέρος 1ο)  (Αρχείο ντοκιμαντέρ της ΕΡΤ)
 Γιάννης Μόραλης (μέρος 2ο)  (Αρχείο ντοκιμαντέρ της ΕΡΤ)

1958 paintings